Operation Sea Guardian is a North Atlantic Treaty Organization (NATO) maritime security operation taking place in the Mediterranean Sea. In July 2016, at the Warsaw Summit, NATO announced the transition of the Article 5 counter-terrorism Operation Active Endeavour into a broader mission in the Mediterranean. Operation Sea Guardian was launched in November 2016 and succeeded Operation Active Endeavour.

Tasks
Operation Sea Guardian is an expanded mission of maritime situational awareness, counter-terrorism at sea, and support to capacity-building missions. The mission is led by the Allied Maritime Command in Northwood, United Kingdom. If specifically tasked to do so, Sea Guardian can also preserve freedom of navigation, conduct maritime interdiction, counter the proliferation of weapons of mass destruction and protect critical infrastructure.

French withdrawal
On 10 June 2020 the French frigate , flagship of the Sea Guardian force, was illuminated by targeting radar as it attempted to approach the Tanzanian-flagged cargo ship, Çirkin, under Turkish Navy escort. Courbet was acting on the belief that the cargo ship may have been attempting to break the United Nations arms embargo on Libya. The Turkish government has denied the French accusation and demanded an apology, stating the cargo ship was carrying humanitarian supplies. Previously, the Turkish Navy had also stopped a Greek frigate from Operation Irini from searching the ship. On 21 September 2020, the European Union sanctioned the Turkish maritime company Avrasya Shipping which operates the freighter Çirkin, because the vessel was found to have violated the arms embargo in Libya in May and June 2020.

See also 
Operation Irini

References

Sea Guardian
Sea Guardian
Mediterranean Sea
Military operations of the 21st-century
Turkey and NATO
France–Turkey relations